Jan Kaus (born 22 January 1971) is an Estonian writer.

Life and work 

Jan Kaus was born in Aegviidu and studied education and philosophy in Tallinn. In 1995, he took his teacher's examination.

Kaus currently works as poetry and prose writer and publicist. In addition, he also works as a literary critic, essayist, visual artist, guitarist and translator from English and Finnish.

From 1998 to 2001 Kaus was the editor of the Estonian literary weekly Sirp. From 2004 to 2007 he was chairman of the Estonian Writers' Union (Estonian Eesti Kirjanike liit). Since 2007, he again worked at Sirp.

Jan Kaus is an accurate and shrewd, sometimes sarcastic observer of Estonia, the New Economy and the Internet age. His poetry and prose take up the social problems in Estonia in the 21st century.

Works 

 Üle ja ümber (novellas, 2000)
 Maailm ja mõni (novel, 2001)
 Õndsate tund (novellas, 2003)
 Läbi Minotauruse (collection of essays, 2003)
 Tema (novel, 2005)
 Miniatuurid (short stories, 2009)
 Hetk (novel, 2009)
 Koju (novel)

References

External links 
 CV, bibliography, book reviews

1971 births
Living people
People from Anija Parish
Estonian male novelists
Estonian male poets
Estonian translators
Estonian male short story writers
21st-century Estonian novelists